Rhyacionia bushnelli, the western pine tip moth, is a moth of the family Tortricidae. It is found in the United States, including Alabama, Nebraska, North Dakota and Montana.

The wingspan is about 13 mm. The forewings are mottled with yellowish gray and reddish brown. The hindwings are gray. There is usually one generation per year.

The larvae feed on the tips of Pinus species, including Pinus ponderosa. Young larvae feed between needles or mine them, while later instars feed inside needle sheaths or buds, then enter new shoots, and mine within developing shoots. The species overwinters in the pupal stage.

References

Moths described in 1914
Eucosmini
Moths of North America